Tìa Dình is a commune (xã) and village of the Điện Biên Đông District of Điện Biên Province, northwestern Vietnam. The commune covers an area of 98.82 square kilometres and has a reported population of 2468.

References

Communes of Điện Biên province
Geography of Điện Biên province